Moy House is  a Georgian country house hotel in County Clare, Ireland, about  south of Lahinch off the N67 road near the village of Moy.

Originally set in 15 acres of woodland on the River Moy, it was built in the mid 18th century as the holiday home of Sir Augustine Fitzgerald. Later it was sold to Major Studdert, who gave his name to the bridges over the road and the river in the West Clare Railway. The house was vacant for 10 years, but was purchased by Antoin O'Looney who undertook a three-year restoration of the property.

It was voted Country House of the Year by Georgina Campbell's Ireland in 2003.

References

Country houses in Ireland
Hotels in County Clare
Georgian architecture in Ireland